This is the discography of American vibraphonist and record producer Roy Ayers.

Studio albums

Roy Ayers Ubiquity

Collaborative albums

Soundtrack albums

Live albums

Compilations, bootlegs, remix and demo albums

Singles

Notes

References

External links
 Roy Ayers discography at AllMusic
 Roy Ayers discography at Discogs
 Roy Ayers Quartet discography at Discogs
 Roy Ayers Ubiquity discography at Discogs

Discographies of American artists
Jazz discographies